German ethnic can refer to:

 Germans
 Volksdeutsche